Newmansville Township is one of eleven townships in Cass County, Illinois, USA.  As of the 2020 census, its population was 68 and it contained 27 housing units.

Geography

Unincorporated towns
 Newmansville
(This list is based on USGS data and may include former settlements.)

Cemeteries
The township contains these three cemeteries: Little Shepherd, Newmansville and Witty.

Demographics
As of the 2020 census there were 68 people, 40 households, and 19 families residing in the township. The racial makeup of the township was 95.59% White, 0.00% African American, 0.00% Native American, 0.00% Asian, 0.00% Pacific Islander, 0.00% from other races, and 4.41% from two or more races. Hispanic or Latino of any race were 1.47% of the population.

There were 40 households, out of which 47.50% had children under the age of 18 living with them, 27.50% were married couples living together, 20.00% had a female householder with no spouse present, and 52.50% were non-families. 52.50% of all households were made up of individuals, and none had someone living alone who was 65 years of age or older. The average household size was 2.80 and the average family size was 4.21.

The township's age distribution consisted of 43.8% under the age of 18, 18.8% from 18 to 24, 16.9% from 25 to 44, 20.5% from 45 to 64, and 0.0% who were 65 years of age or older. The median age was 18.3 years. For every 100 females, there were 138.3 males. For every 100 females age 18 and over, there were 215.0 males.

School districts
 A C Central Community Unit School District 262
 Porta Community Unit School District 202

Political districts
 Illinois' 18th congressional district
 State House District 93
 State Senate District 47

References
 
 United States Census Bureau 2007 TIGER/Line Shapefiles
 United States National Atlas

External links
 City-Data.com
 Illinois State Archives

Townships in Cass County, Illinois
Townships in Illinois
1923 establishments in Illinois